"Cornfields or Cadillacs" is a single by Canadian country music band Farmer's Daughter. Released in 1996, it was the first single from their album Makin' Hay. The song reached #1 on the RPM Country Tracks chart in November 1996.

Chart performance

Year-end charts

References

1996 singles
Farmer's Daughter songs
Songs written by Marcus Hummon
Songs written by Monty Powell
1996 songs
Universal Music Canada singles